Prey for the Devil is a 2022 American supernatural horror film directed by Daniel Stamm and stars Jacqueline Byers, Colin Salmon, Christian Navarro, Lisa Palfrey, Nicholas Ralph, Virginia Madsen, and Ben Cross.  

The film is about a nun who trains as an exorcist under the Roman Catholic Church and confronts demonic possession.  

Lionsgate distributed Prey for the Devil in theaters in the United States and Canada on October 28, 2022. The film received negative reviews from critics.

Plot 
In response to a global rise in demonic possessions, the Catholic Church reopens exorcism schools to train priests in the Rite of Exorcism. 

Although nuns are forbidden to perform exorcisms, Father Quinn recognizes Sister Ann's gifts, including empathy with possessed victims of demons, and agrees to train her. Thrust onto the spiritual frontline with fellow student Father Dante, Ann finds herself in a battle for the soul of a young girl, Natalie, who she believes is possessed by a demon who tormented Ann's mentally unstable mother years ago. 

Ann attends classes, against some resistance from staff members and amusement by some priests. Frightening events begin to happen to her, such as disturbing visions and memories, and an elderly, possessed male patient harassing her and dancing with her against her will when she is trapped in his room. However, Ann persists in her quest, delving into secret archives with the help of Dante, and looking into the histories of "terminal cases" likely to die, and of one woman who was released from the institute. 

Ann helps exorcise Dante's troubled sister, apparently successfully. However, the school's leadership and the Cardinal tell her next morning that the woman killed herself. Ann unhappily concludes that she will go back to her old convent in response to the tragedy. However, Dante drops by and says that Natalie, who had recovered and left the school, has had a relapse and is likely to be sent to the Vatican as a "terminal case". He convinces her to sneak into the school with him and exorcise Natalie.

Ann is shocked to find that Natalie is her own daughter, whom Ann gave up for adoption years ago, when she was pregnant as a teenager. The anguish of abandonment has made Natalie subject to demonic possession. Eventually, the demon leaves Natalie free but possesses Ann, who falls into a large pool of holy water and, fighting through the anguish of her troubled history, eventually frees herself from the demon.

The school's leadership reward her with an academic fellowship to the Vatican; however, while in a cab, Ann finds that the driver is the old man who had harassed her under demonic influence. The cab stops in the street, and a sinister-looking woman, who was the one released from the institute, stares at her from the street. Ann arms herself with a crucifix as the driver snarls and lunges at her.

Cast
 Jacqueline Byers as Sister Ann
 Debora Zhecheva as young Ann
 Christian Navarro as Father Dante
 Posy Taylor as Natalie
 Colin Salmon as Father Quinn
 Nicholas Ralph as Father Raymond
 Ben Cross as Cardinal Matthews
 Virginia Madsen as Dr. Peters
 Lisa Palfrey as Sister Euphemia
 Koyna Ruseva as Ann's mother
 Cora Kirk as Emilia
 Elizabeth Gibson as Sister Kylie
 Velizar Binev as Father Bernhard
 Yana Marinova as Natalie's mother
 Keith Bartlett as Clarke

Production
In October 2019, the film was first announced as The Devil's Light. The screenplay was written by Robert Zappia, and James Hawes was initially set to direct. Lionsgate and Gold Circle Films co-produced the film, with shooting planned to take place in the spring of 2020. Paul Brooks, Jessica Malanaphy, Todd R. Jones, and Earl Richey Jones produced the film while Scott Niemeyer, David Brooks and Brad Kessell were executive producers. Zappia's screenplay, originally titled The Devil's Flame, had made the 2018 BloodList. In February 2020, Daniel Stamm was set to direct instead, marking his return to the exorcism sub-genre after the 2010 film The Last Exorcism.<ref name=":0">{{Cite web|last=|first=|date=2020-02-20|title=The Last Exorcism' 's Daniel Stamm to Direct The Devil's Light|url=https://www.joblo.com/horror-movies/news/the-last-exorcisms-daniel-stamm-to-direct-the-devils-light|url-status=live|archive-url=|archive-date=|access-date=2021-01-29|website=JoBlo}}</ref> In June 2020, Jacqueline Byers was announced as the lead actress, starring alongside Virginia Madsen, Ben Cross, Colin Salmon, Christian Navarro, and Nicholas Ralph.

Filming took place during the summer of 2020 in Sofia, Bulgaria. Actor Ben Cross died on August 18, 2020, and had wrapped filming for his part ten days beforehand.

ReleasePrey for the Devil was released in theatres on October 28, 2022, by Lionsgate. It was previously scheduled to be theatrically released in the United States on January 8, 2021, then moved to February 11, 2022.

The film was released for VOD platforms on December 13, 2022, followed by a Blu-ray, DVD and 4K UHD release on January 3, 2023.

 Reception 
 Box office Prey for the Devil  grossed $19.8 million in the United States and Canada, and $24.9 million in other territories, for a worldwide total of $44.7 million.

In the United States and Canada, Prey for the Devil was released alongside the wide expansions of Tár and Till, and was projected to gross $7–8 million from 2,980 theaters in its opening weekend. The film made $2.8 million on its first day, including $660,000 from Thursday night previews. It went on to debut to $7.2 million, finishing third at the box office. In its second weekend the film dropped 46% to $3.9 million, finishing in fifth.

Critical response
On the review aggregator website Rotten Tomatoes, 17% of 35 critics' reviews are positive, with an average rating of 4.2/10. The website's consensus reads, "There's no dearth of possession stories within the genre, and potboiler Prey for the Devil'' may leave completists needing a truly horrific — or at least fun — exorcist palate cleanser." Metacritic, which uses a weighted average, assigned the film a score of 38 out of 100, based on five critics, indicating "generally unfavorable reviews". Audiences polled by CinemaScore gave the film an average grade of "C+" on an A+ to F scale, while those at PostTrak gave it a 64% overall positive score (including an average 2.5 out of 5 stars).

References

External links
 
 
 

2020s American films
2020s English-language films
2020s horror drama films
2020s supernatural horror films
2022 films
2022 horror films
2020s pregnancy films
American supernatural horror films
Demons in film
Lionsgate films
Films about Catholic nuns
Films about exorcism
Films about spirit possession
Films directed by Daniel Stamm
Films scored by Nathan Barr
Films set in Boston
Films shot in Sofia
Religious horror films